Jacobsdal was a hamlet in South Africa 13 km south of Zeerust and 18 km north-east of Ottoshoop. It was laid out on the farm Vergenoegd 46 and named after its owner, David Jacobs. It declined after the establishment of Zeerust a short distance away.

References

Populated places in the Ramotshere Moiloa Local Municipality